Stephan Elliott  (born 27 August 1964) is an Australian film director and screenwriter. His best-known film internationally is The Adventures of Priscilla, Queen of the Desert (1994).

Career
Elliott began his career as an assistant director working in the boom of the Australian film industry of the 1980s.

His first two feature films, Frauds (starring musician Phil Collins) and The Adventures of Priscilla, Queen of the Desert, along with his lesser known, shorter films Fast and The Agreement were produced by Rebel Penfold-Russell's Australian production company Latent Image Productions.

Frauds, The Adventures of Priscilla, Queen of the Desert and Welcome to Woop Woop were all officially selected to screen at the Cannes Film Festival, with "Priscilla" winning the Prix du public as well as an Academy Award for Best Costume Design, among numerous other accolades. For a time during 1982/83, Stephan and Troy Tempest presented The Blues Brothers, every Friday night for over a year, at the heritage listed Cremorne Orpheum theatre. Dressed as Jake and Elwood, Stephan and Troy appeared on TV several times, along with their Bluesmobile.

In 2004, Elliott was involved in a skiing accident which saw him hospitalised for several months. He credits the accident with rediscovering his sense of humour. This may go part way to explaining why, in 2007 Elliott worked with  Fred Nassiri to create one of the most expensive music videos of all time. Shot in over 15 countries, with seven directors the song "Love Sees No Colour" aspires to spread a message of peace and love.

His film Easy Virtue, was written with co-writer Sheridan Jobbins, and is based on the Noël Coward play of the same name. It stars Colin Firth, Kristin Scott Thomas, Jessica Biel and Ben Barnes. It was produced by Barnaby Thompson for Ealing Studios in the UK, and premiered at the Toronto International Film Festival on 8 September 2008. It has also screened in the Rio Film Festival, Rome Film Festival and London Film Festival to great acclaim.

His next film, A Few Best Men starring Xavier Samuel and Olivia Newton-John was released in 2012.

Other writing credits include the script for the stage play of Priscilla, which premiered in 2007 at Sydney's Lyric Theatre in Star City to excellent reviews. Later in the year, it moved The Regent Theatre in Melbourne and in May 2008 to Auckland's The Civic theatre in New Zealand, and then in London's West End.

Personal life
Elliott came out as gay during his presentation at the inaugural AACTA Awards in Sydney on 31 January 2012. He has been in a relationship with his partner, Wil Bevolley, since the late 1980s. They had a civil partnership ceremony in London in 2008.

Filmography
Frauds (1993)
The Adventures of Priscilla, Queen of the Desert (1994)
Welcome to Woop Woop (1997)
Eye of the Beholder (1999)
Easy Virtue (2008)
A Few Best Men (2011)
Rio, I Love You (2014)
Swinging Safari (2017)

References

External links 

Unofficial fansite
Official website for 'Priscilla' the stage musical
Toronto Film Festival review of Easy Virtue
Compiled news articles about Stephan Elliott

1964 births
Australian film directors
Australian male screenwriters
Australian LGBT screenwriters
Australian gay writers
LGBT film directors
Gay screenwriters
Living people
People from Sydney
People educated at Sydney Grammar School